Wykeham, Lincolnshire may refer to several deserted villages in Lincolnshire, England:

East Wykeham, in the civil parish of Ludford
West Wykeham, in the civil parish of Ludford
Wykeham, Nettleton, Lincolnshire, near Nettleton Top, Nettleton
Wykeham, Weston, Lincolnshire, in the civil parish of Weston